A by-election was held for the New South Wales Legislative Assembly electorate of Armidale on 17 February 1973 because of the resignation of Davis Hughes who had accepted the position of Agent-General in London.

Dates

Result

				

Davis Hughes resigned to be appointed Agent-General in London.

See also
Electoral results for the district of Armidale
List of New South Wales state by-elections

Notes

References

1973 elections in Australia
New South Wales state by-elections
1970s in New South Wales
February 1973 events in Australia